Thaumastocera is a genus of horse flies in the family Tabanidae.

Species
Thaumastocera akwa Grünberg, 1906
Thaumastocera cervaria Séguy, 1935

References

Brachycera genera
Tabanidae
Diptera of Africa
Taxa named by Karl Grünberg